Freddy's Favorites: Best of A Nightmare on Elm Street is a soundtrack album for the Nightmare on Elm Street series. It features "the best" of the soundtracks from the first six Elm Street films.

Track listing 
 1: Prologue - 0:32
 Main Title - 3:30
 Dream Attack - 1:18
 Sleep Clinic - 2:23
 Terror in the Tub - 0:54
 Lurking - 0:59
 Fountain of Blood - 1:03
 Evil Freddy - 0:53
 2: Main Title - 2:28
 Kissing Freddy on the Catwalk - 3:16
 Kill for Me - 2:33
 Sports Attack/Threatening Angela - 2:33
 Freed of Her - 1:28
 Snake-In-The-Class - 0:58
 3. Opening - 1:51
 Taryn's Deepest Fear - 2:47
 Deceptive Romance - 2:44
 Rumbling Room - 1:13
 Puppet Walk - 3:23
 4: Freddy's Back - 4:26
 Joey's Wet Dream - 1:36
 Freddy's Pizza Restaurant - 1:55
 Debbie Checks in/Time Circles - 4:27
 5: Prologue - Elm Street Kids - 0:44
 Main Title - 3:20
 Don't Drink and Drive - 1:41
 The Asylum - 1:09
 Hell on Wheels - 2:06
 Freddy Cuts Up - 1:49
 6: Opening Titles - 1:26
 Main Title - 2:15
 Mama's Q-Tip - 0:34
 Back With Doc - 1:34
 Freddy Wins - 0:48
 Happy Father's Day - 4:18

Personnel
Charles Bernstein (composer)
Soundtrack for A Nightmare on Elm Street
Christopher Young (composer)
Soundtrack for A Nightmare on Elm Street 2: Freddy's Revenge
Angelo Badalamenti (composer)
Soundtrack A Nightmare on Elm Street 3: Dream Warriors
Craig Safan (composer)
Soundtrack for A Nightmare on Elm Street 4: The Dream Master
Jay Ferguson (composer)
Soundtrack for A Nightmare on Elm Street 5: The Dream Child
Brian May (composer)
Soundtrack for Freddy's Dead: The Final Nightmare
Matthew Peak (artwork)
Dub Taylor (preparation for release)
Robert Townson (preparation for release)

References 

A Nightmare on Elm Street (franchise) music
1993 soundtrack albums
Horror film soundtracks